Fernando Júlio Perdigão (11 November 1932 — 16 February 2007) was a Portuguese footballer who played as a forward.

References

External links 
 
 
 
 

1932 births
2007 deaths
Portuguese footballers
Association football forwards
Primeira Liga players
FC Porto players
Portugal international footballers
Mozambican emigrants to Portugal